RCV may stand for:

Rabbit calicivirus
Radio Club Venezolano, Venezuela
Ranked-choice voting (disambiguation)
Red cell volume, a concept related to hematocrit but concerning total rather than percentage
Refuse collection vehicle
Remote control vehicle
Riot control vehicle, see RCV-9